Mount Hunter is a rural town in the Macarthur Region of New South Wales, Australia. A large portion of the area is within the Wollondilly Shire and the rest is located within Camden Council.

References

External links
  [CC-By-SA]

Towns in the Macarthur (New South Wales)
Wollondilly Shire